V: Hävitetty ("Chapter V: Ravaged") is the fifth full-length album by Finnish pagan metal band Moonsorrow. It was released on 10 January 2007 through Spinefarm Records. As a joke by the band, the name "Homosika" (gay pig) was released as the working title for "Viides Luku - Hävitetty".

Hävitetty follows up on the sound established on Moonsorrow's previous studio album, Verisäkeet. The album consists of only two songs, each exceeding 25 minutes in length, and act as organic compositions with recurring musical themes which are gradually built upon up to climaxes.  While the folk instruments and choirs of prior albums are still present, Hävitetty has a more prominent black metal influence; for example it features tremolo picking and blast beats. In The New York Times, the album was called "an engrossing hourlong album," and "engrossing, enveloping music."

Track listing

Personnel
 Ville Sorvali - vocals, bass, fretless bass, choirs
 Marko Tarvonen - drums, percussion, guitars, vocals (backing), mandolin, choirs
 Markus Eurén - keyboards, choir
 Mitja Harvilahti - guitars, vocals (backing), choirs
 Henri Sorvali - keyboards, guitars, mouth harp, accordion, vocals, choir

Guest musicians
 Janne Perttilä - choirs
 Thomas Väänänen - vocals
 Jukka Varmo - choirs

Production
 Tanja Ahtila - band photography
 Travis Smith - cover art
 Mika Jussila - mastering
 Henri Sorvali - mixing, producer, editing
 Ahti Kortelainen - recording, mixing

References

2007 albums
Moonsorrow albums
Spinefarm Records albums
Albums with cover art by Travis Smith (artist)